Adrián Menéndez Maceiras was the defending champion but chose not to defend his title.

Luca Vanni won the title after defeating Mario Vilella Martínez 6–4, 6–4 in the final.

Seeds

Draw

Finals

Top half

Bottom half

References
Main Draw
Qualifying Draw

2018 ATP Challenger Tour
2018 Singles